A thermostatic radiator valve (TRV) is a self-regulating valve fitted to hot water heating system radiator, to control the temperature of a room by changing the flow of hot water to the radiator.

Functioning

Conventional wax motor TRV 
The classic thermostatic radiator valve contains a plug, typically made of wax (forming a wax motor), which expands or contracts with the surrounding temperature. This plug is connected to a pin which in turn is connected to a valve. The valve gradually closes as the temperature of the surrounding area increases, limiting the amount of hot water entering the radiator. This allows a maximum temperature to be set for each room.

As the valve works by sensing the temperature of the air surrounding it, it is important to ensure that it is not covered by material (such as curtains). If the controller is removed from the valve, the valve turns on and the radiator will always be hot.

Interaction with room thermostats 
Thermostatic radiator valve should not be installed in the same room where the room (air temperature) thermostat is installed. This is because in the case that the TRV set temperature is below the room thermostat set temperature, the TRV would shut off the radiator before the latter temperature is reached. The central heating boiler would continue to run in an attempt to reach the room thermostat set temperature, potentially heating the rest of the house to uncomfortably high levels if TRVs are not installed on the radiators in every room. If both TRV and thermostat set temperatures were set equally, unpredictable behaviour may occur with both devices attempting to control the room temperature. Therefore, in case of installing a TRV and an air temperature based boiler thermostat in the same room, the TRV should be set to a higher temperature than the room thermostat.

Compared to manual control 
The replacement of a manual heating control with a conventional wax motor TRV has been estimated to save at least  of CO per year (in 2011 for a British semi-detached house with 3 bedrooms and gas heating). They are also considerably cost-efficient, using heat only when needed, and can reduce heating bills by up to 17 percent a year.

Electronically controlled variants 
As of 2012, electronically controlled TRVs have become more common, and some of these are marketed as smart thermostats or even smart TRVS. They frequently use electronic temperature sensing, and can often be programmed or remote-controlled so that individual radiators in a house can be programmed for different temperatures at different times of the day. Such increased control allows more advanced controls, which can result in even better energy and CO savings. Some other possibilites with such systems is that the temperature sensor can be placed away from the radiator in another place in the room, which may result in a more relevant temperature reading in the room which can be used to set the TRVs operating point. Some electronically controlled valves run on batteries which must be changed at regular intervals, while others can be connected to the power grid. Electronically controlled variants may also require additional setup, for example by connecting to a mobile phone application through a smart home hub using wireless protocols such as Zigbee or Z-Wave

Some of the more well known manufacturers of smart TRVS include Wiser by Drayton Controls, Tado, Hive and Bosch.

Temperature scales 
Instead of marking the adjustment knobs with temperature in the Celsius scale, many manufacturers have a tradition of using their own scales, for example 1-5. Why manufacturers have chosen not to use actual temperature scales is not clear. The table below gives some examples of conversion from proprietary scales to the Celsius scale.

Physical connection standards 
There are several different standards for the screw connection between the TRVs adjustment wheel and the thermostat on the radiator. Some common examples are:

 M28x1.5 valve (27.5 mm) - Used by MMA, Herz, Orkli, COMAP, T+A, and others
 Caleffi valve
 Danfoss: Several variants, for example K valve (M30x1.5), RA valve (23 mm), RAV valve (34 mm), RAVL valve (26 mm) or the RTD valve
 Giacomini valve

See also 
 Thermostatic mixing valve
 Wax thermostatic element
 Thermostat

Notes and references 

Residential heating
Plumbing
Temperature control

it:Termostato